Compton Beauchamp House (sometimes Compton House) is a Grade I listed building in Compton Beauchamp, Oxfordshire. The house was originally built in the 16th century but its interior was remodelled and its front rebuilt in the Baroque in around 1710. It was owned by the Fettiplace family and is a Grade I listed building.

References

Grade I listed houses in Oxfordshire